Nikola Andrić (born 23 May 1992) is a Serbian professional footballer who plays as a defender for Borac Banja Luka.

Career
Andrić made his first-team debut for Mladenovac in the Serbian League Belgrade. He later moved abroad to Slovakia and joined ŽP Šport Podbrezová.

In June 2016, Andrić returned to his homeland and signed with Serbian SuperLiga club Mladost Lučani.

In 23 January 2020, Andrić signed with Serbian SuperLiga club Vojvodina from Novi Sad.

Honours
Vojvodina
Serbian Cup: 2019–20

References

External links
 
 
 
 

Association football defenders
Expatriate footballers in Slovakia
FK Mladost Lučani players
FK Železiarne Podbrezová players
Footballers from Belgrade
OFK Mladenovac players
FK Vojvodina players
Serbian expatriate footballers
Serbian expatriate sportspeople in Slovakia
Serbian footballers
Serbian SuperLiga players
Slovak Super Liga players
2. Liga (Slovakia) players
1992 births
Living people